Jalsoor is a village in the southern state of Karnataka, NH 275, Jalsoor-Subramanya SH85. India. It is located in the Sullia taluk of Dakshina Kannada district in Karnataka. This village is major hub connecting three cities in coastal and Kodagu district, including Mangalore, Kasaragod and Madikeri. It is one of the main place of trade and transaction in Sullia taluk. Former chief Minister of Karnataka .D.V Sadananda Gowda hailed from this village.

Demographics
 India census, Jalsoor had a population of 6368 with 3176 males and 3192 females.

Image gallery

See also
 Dakshina Kannada
 Districts of Karnataka

References

External links
 https://dk.nic.in/

Villages in Dakshina Kannada district